Braxton Key (born February 14, 1997) is an American professional basketball player for the Delaware Blue Coats of the NBA G League. He played college basketball for the Alabama Crimson Tide and the Virginia Cavaliers.

Early life and high school career
Key is the nephew of NBA player Ralph Sampson, who starred at the University of Virginia. Key's father Eric Key played at Radford. Key played three seasons for Christ Presbyterian Academy. He transferred to Oak Hill Academy, where he led the team to a 45–1 record and national championship.

College career
Key averaged a team-high 12 points and 5.7 rebounds per game as a freshman at Alabama. He scored a season-high 26 points against Georgia and was named to the All-SEC Freshman team. As a sophomore, Key averaged 7.0 points, 5.3 rebounds, 1.8 assists and 0.4 blocks per game. He was hobbled by a knee injury that forced him to miss some playing time.

After the season, Key transferred to Virginia and was granted an immediate eligibility waiver by the NCAA. In the 2018–19 season, Key won a national championship at Virginia, scoring six points, pulling down 10 rebounds and blocking one shot in the title game against Texas Tech. Key averaged 5.7 points and 5.3 rebounds as a junior, starting six games. Key had surgery for a wrist injury in November 2019 and missed several games. He returned to action on December 18 against Stony Brook. At the conclusion of the regular season, Key was named All-ACC Honorable Mention. As a senior, Key averaged 9.9 points, 7.4 rebounds, and 1.8 assists per game.

Professional career

Delaware Blue Coats (2021–2022)
After going undrafted in the 2020 NBA draft, Key joined the Delaware Blue Coats of the NBA G League in January 2021, after being selected in the G League draft. On March 2, he posted a season-high 19 points to go with five rebounds, two assists, two steals two blocks in a 120-92 win over the NBA G League Ignite.

On October 13, 2021, Key signed with the Philadelphia 76ers, but was waived the same day. On October 25, he re-signed with Delaware. In 43 career NBA G League games, he averaged 14.8 points, 6.1 rebounds, 2.9 assists, 1.8 steals and 1.3 blocks in 23.7 minutes.

Philadelphia 76ers (2022)
On January 5, 2022, Key signed a 10-day contract with the Philadelphia 76ers. Key appeared in two games for the 76ers, scoring two points in six total minutes. After his 10-day contract expired, Key was reacquired by the Delaware Blue Coats.

Detroit Pistons (2022)
On March 24, 2022, Key signed a 10-day contract with the Detroit Pistons. On April 3, he signed a two-way contract. On December 26, 2022, Key was waived.

Second stint with Delaware (2023–present)
On January 1, 2023, Key was re-acquired by the Delaware Blue Coats.

Career statistics

NBA

|-
| style="text-align:left;"| 
| style="text-align:left;"| Philadelphia
| 2 || 0 || 3.0 || .500 || .000 || — || 1.0 || .5 || .5 || .0 || 1.0
|-
| style="text-align:left;"| 
| style="text-align:left;"| Detroit
| 9 || 0 || 21.2 || .457 || .300 || .538 || 5.3 || 1.1 || 1.0 || 1.2 || 8.6
|-
| style="text-align:left;"| 
| style="text-align:left;"| Detroit
| 3 || 0 || 3.0 || 1.000 || – || 1.000 || .3 || .0 || .0 || .0 || 1.3
|- class="sortbottom"
| style="text-align:center;" colspan="2"| Career
| 14 || 0 || 14.7 || .466 || .286 || .600 || 3.6 || .8 || .7 || .8 || 5.9

College

|-
| style="text-align:left;"| 2016–17
| style="text-align:left;"| Alabama
| 34 || 30 || 29.8 || .433 || .330 || .634 || 5.7 || 2.5 || .6 || .6 || 12.0
|-
| style="text-align:left;"| 2017–18
| style="text-align:left;"| Alabama
| 26 || 17 || 25.2 || .409 || .250 || .667 || 5.3 || 1.8 || 1.0 || .4 || 7.0
|-
| style="text-align:left;"| 2018–19
| style="text-align:left;"| Virginia
| 38 || 6 || 19.8 || .433 || .305 || .731 || 5.3 || 1.0 || .9 || .6 || 5.7
|-
| style="text-align:left;"| 2019–20
| style="text-align:left;"| Virginia
| 27 || 25 || 33.6 || .435 || .185 || .584 || 7.4 || 1.8 || 1.2 || .6 || 9.9
|- class="sortbottom"
| style="text-align:center;" colspan="2"| Career
| 125 || 78 || 26.6 || .429 || .274 || .645 || 5.8 || 1.8 || .9 || .6 || 8.6

References

External links
Virginia Cavaliers bio
Alabama Crimson Tide bio

1997 births
Living people
Alabama Crimson Tide men's basketball players
American men's basketball players
Basketball players from Charlotte, North Carolina
Delaware Blue Coats players
Detroit Pistons players
Motor City Cruise players
Philadelphia 76ers players
Power forwards (basketball)
Small forwards
Undrafted National Basketball Association players
Virginia Cavaliers men's basketball players